The University of Pittsburgh School of Social Work, one of the 13 schools and colleges within the University of Pittsburgh, is located in the Oakland section of Pittsburgh, Pennsylvania. Its offices are in the world-famous Cathedral of Learning, a forty-story, Gothic style edifice that is the signature building of the university.

The School of Social Work offers bachelor's, master's, and doctoral degrees in social work.  The master's program at the school is ranked 17th in the nation according to the U.S. News & World Reports Best Social Work Graduate Schools. The school's doctoral program Social Work was created in 1945 and is the second oldest social work doctoral program in the nation.  The school also administers the statewide Child Welfare Education and Research Programs from the Oakland Campus and the Child Welfare Resource Center for the Commonwealth of Pennsylvania in Mechanicsburg, Pennsylvania.

History
The School of Social Work at the University of Pittsburgh was formed in 1918 as a division of the university's School of Economics, Department of Sociology.  As part of the required accreditation process at the time, course work was offered to a cohort of students for one year before the program was first officially accredited in 1919 by the American Association of Schools of Professional Social Work (AASPSW).  The AASPSW was a predecessor to the Council on Social Work Education (CSWE), the current accreditor of academic social work programs.  Early curricular emphases were child welfare, mental health, and community building.  Seventeen faculty offered 19 courses.  In 1922, the university withdrew its social work program from the AASPSW.  Though social work courses continued to be offered, the formal social work program was disbanded.

In 1926, Manuel Conrad Elmer was recruited from the University of Minnesota as chair of the Department of Sociology at the University of Pittsburgh.  Elmer, who received one of the first doctorates in sociology from the University of Chicago (1914), was instrumental in building and developing the Sociology Department at the University of Pittsburgh.  (Elmer published his last book at age 101 in 1987.)  Elmer was also committed to rebuilding the social work program at the University of Pittsburgh.  In 1928, course listings in social work reappeared.  In 1931, the Division of Social Work was created as a separate unit within the Department of Sociology.  Students in that era earned a Master of Arts in Social Work.  Also in 1931, the Division of Social Work established an Agency Advisory Committee, an Agency Advisory Committee for Group Work, an Agency Advisory Committee for Medical Social Work, and an Agency Advisory Committee for Policy Studies.  In 1932, the university began the process of having its accreditation reinstated by the AASPSW, a request made formally in January 1933.  In July 1933, Dr. Marion Hathway was recruited by Elmer from the University of Chicago as an assistant professor.  Hathway's responsibilities were to direct the social work program, obtain accreditation for the program and to build toward the establishment of a School of Social Work separate form the Department of Sociology.  In 1934, Dr. Hathway was given the title “Assistant Director of the Division of Social Work.”  Also in 1934, the AASPSW approved the university's application for full membership.  At that time, the program had an unduplicated enrollment of 252 students.   In 1937, the AASPSW granted the university full accreditation of its social work program retroactively to 1934.  In 1938, the University of Pittsburgh created the School of Applied Social Sciences as the university's 18th separate school.  (Currently the university is divided into 13 colleges and schools after a number of consolidations.)  Wilbur I. Newstetter became the new school's first dean in 1938 and served until 1962.  Historically, the social work program has had several designations:  Division of Social Work (1918–1922); Division of Social Work in the Department of Sociology (1931–1938); School of Applied Social Sciences (1938–1947); School of Social Work (1947–1957); Graduate School of Social Work (1957–1971); and the School of Social Work (1971 to the present).  For the remainder of this article, the social work program will be referred to as “the School.”

During the 1930s and 1940s, the school's curriculum embraced the traditional social casework course of studies, but began immediately to create curriculum, deliver papers in such forums as the National Council of Social Work and publish articles and text books in social group work and community organization (initially called “intergroup work”) by Dean W. I. Newstetter, a major contributor to the formation of this field of specialization in social work.,

Also during the 1940s, Dr. Hathway spearheaded the creation of a doctoral program, secured University approval and became the program's first director in 1945.  During the 1940s, a debate emerged in social work education between scholars and practitioners of two schools of thought.  They were the diagnostic approach based in part on the work of Sigmund Freud and the functional approach based in part on the work of Otto Rank. The University of Pittsburgh School was divided on this issue with nationally recognized proponents on both sides.  Eventually, when social casework faculty member Ruth Smalley completed her Doctor of Social Work (DSW) in 1949, she left the Pittsburgh faculty to join the faculty at the University of Pennsylvania, a primarily Rankian school.  Pittsburgh remained strongly in the diagnostic camp thereafter.

During the 1950s and 1960s, the school continued to expand enrollment, develop the major curricular emphases of the Master of Social Work (MSW) program (social casework, social group work and community organization), and build the doctoral program which became a Doctor of Philosophy (Ph.D.) program.   Heavy emphasis in the master's program was given to child welfare, medical social work, mental health and school social work.  In addition, an MSW major in research was added and a variety of joint degree programs were established.  At the MSW level, these included one of the oldest joint Master of Social Work/Master of Divinity degree programs in the nation (still thriving); Master of Social Work/ Master of Jewish Communal Services; Master of Social Work/Master of Public Administration; Master of Social Work/Master of Public Health; and Master of Social Work/Juris Doctor.  In addition, a joint Master of Public Health and Doctor of Philosophy was implemented.

The 1970s was another period of rapid growth in enrollment and major curricular developments.  In 1973, the school abandoned the traditional social casework, social group work, community organization framework and adopted an integrated academic paradigm.  This new design identified four major areas (concentrations) of study: Children, Youth and Families; Health and Mental Health; Poverty and Associated Problems; and Juvenile and Criminal Justice.  Within each of these, students also selected a specialization from among Interpersonal Skills; Organization and Planning; Administration and Policy; and Research.

In 1969, a commission chaired by University of Pittsburgh Professor Erma Myerson and financed by The Heinz Endowments of Pittsburgh completed a study of the future of undergraduate social work education for the Council on Social Work.  The report of this commission paved the way for accredited undergraduate social work education.  However, it was not until 1973 that the University of Pittsburgh launched its own bachelor's program in social work.

Expansion of curriculum, enrollment, faculty, research and publications characterized the next 25 to 30 years.  Child welfare, mental health and gerontology were the beneficiaries of extensive external support and extended their reach statewide, nationally and internationally.

In the decade beginning about 2001, a major investment was made in the development of a university Center on Race and Social Problems in the school.  This center was created to foster multidisciplinary research on race related social issues, mentor scholars whose research focuses on race as a defining social problem in America, and to disseminate race related knowledge.  The center focuses on race related social problems in criminal justice, economic disparities, educational disparities, health, interracial group relations, mental health, and youth families and the elderly.  As parts of its work, the center publishes the professional Journal Race and Social Problems.

Academic programs

Bachelor of Arts in Social Work (BASW)
The BASW Program includes a liberal arts base and prepares students for entry-level generalist social work and for graduate education.  The program aims to provide students with the skills needed to engage in culturally competent practice with diverse populations; promotes critical analysis of environmental factors affecting individuals, families, and communities; and promote advocacy for those who confront institutional barriers in order to prepare students for service and leadership.

Master of Social Work Program (MSW)
The MSW program is designed to provide education for advanced professional practice. The program's foundation curriculum provides the knowledge, skill development, and values that embody the generalist social work perspective. Specializations include Direct Practice with Individuals, Families, and Small Groups (Direct Practice) and Community Organization and Social Administration (COSA). Areas of focus and certificate opportunities include: Integrated Health; Children, Youth, and Families; Gerontology; Home and School Visitor/School Social Worker; Human Services Management; Mental Health; Community Organization; and Social Administration.

Doctoral Program
The social work doctoral program awarded its first degrees in 1949 and prepares students for careers in academic research, teaching, or social policy planning and administration.

Joint Degree Programs
The school offers the following joint/dual degrees: Master of Social Work/Master of Business Administration (MBA); Master of Social Work/Master of Divinity; Master of Social Work/Master of Public Administration; Master of Social Work/Master of Public and International Affairs; Master of Social Work/Master of International Development; Master of Social Work/Doctor of Philosophy (PhD) in Social Work; Master of Social Work/Master of Public Health; Master of Social Work/Juris Doctor; Master of Social Work with a Certificate in Secondary Education (MSW/CAST); and PhD/Master of Public Health (MPH).

Center on Race and Social Problems (CRSP)
The Center on Race and Social Problems was designed to address societal problems through research, intervention, and education. It is the first center of its kind to be housed in a school of social work and it is unique in both its multidisciplinary approach and its multiracial focus. The mission of CRSP is to conduct solution-oriented social science research on race, ethnicity, and color and their influence on the quality of life for Americans in the 21st century. CRSP has identified seven major areas of race-related social problems: economic disparities; educational disparities; interracial group relations; mental health practices and outcomes; youth, families, and the elderly; criminal justice; and health.

Alumni
Hundreds of the school's alumni have attained major leadership careers as public officials; deans, directors, chancellors and presidents in higher education and social work education; researchers and faculty; and executives of social service agencies, foundations and professional organizations; and a wide range of administrative and leadership positions in industry, commerce, the military, and government.

References

External links
School of Social Work homepage
Center on Race and Social Problems homepage
Child Welfare Education and Research Programs homepage

University Of Pittsburgh School of Social Work
Schools of social work in the United States
Educational institutions established in 1918
1918 establishments in Pennsylvania